Oudoleň is a municipality and village in Havlíčkův Brod District in the Vysočina Region of the Czech Republic. It has about 400 inhabitants.

Notable people
Milan Chalupa (born 1953), ice hockey player

References

Villages in Havlíčkův Brod District